Jesus Joldloman was a Filipino comics artist best known for his 1970s work for DC Comics and Marvel Comics, which he signed Jess Jodloman.

References

External links
 
 Jess Jodloman on Lambiek's Comiclopedia.

Filipino comics artists
1925 births
2018 deaths